Aaahh!!! Real Monsters is an American animated television series created by Gábor Csupó and Peter Gaffney, and produced by Klasky Csupo in the United States. The show focuses on three young monsters: Ickis, Oblina, and Krumm, who attend an institute for monsters under a city dump to learn how to frighten humans. It premiered on Nickelodeon on October 29, 1994, and ended on December 6, 1997, with a total of 52 episodes over the course of 4 seasons.

Series overview

Episodes

Pilot

Season 1 (1994–95)

Season 2 (1995)

Season 3 (1996)

Season 4 (1997)

Crossover episode with Rugrats (1999)

References

External links
 

Aaahh!!! Real Monsters episodes, List of
Aaahh!!!
Episodes
Aaahh!!! Real Monsters